Pedder may refer to

Persons
John Pedder (c1520−1571), English priest
John Lewes Pedder (1784–1859), Chief Justice of Tasmania

Geography
Pedder's Hill, a hill west of Government Hill in Hong Kong
Pedder station, now part of Central MTR station in Hong Kong
Pedder Street in Central, Hong Kong
Lake Pedder, lake Tasmania, Australia

Animal
Pedder galaxias, Australian freshwater fish